Morpholine salicylate is a nonsteroidal anti-inflammatory drug.

References 

Nonsteroidal anti-inflammatory drugs